Student of the Bedroom is a 1970 West German comedy film directed by Michael Verhoeven and starring Christof Wackernagel, Gila von Weitershausen and Hannelore Elsner.

Main cast
 Christof Wackernagel as Christof Müller
 Gila von Weitershausen as Nicci Krüger
 Hannelore Elsner as Brigitte
 Karl Dall as Sportsfreund
 Henry van Lyck as Justus von Liebig
 Stella Adorf as Fee
 Henri Henrion as Peter
 Melanie Horeschowsky as Frau Mehlwald
 Alfons Teuber as Herr Mehlwald
 Ludwig Schmid-Wildy as Vorgesetzter
 Gustl Bayrhammer as Herr Krüger

References

Bibliography
 Reimer, Robert C. & Reimer, Carol J. The A to Z of German Cinema. Scarecrow Press, 2010.

External links

1970 films
1970 comedy films
German comedy films
West German films
1970s German-language films
Films directed by Michael Verhoeven
Films set in universities and colleges
Films set in Munich
Films based on Danish novels
Constantin Film films
1970s German films